Saray is a rural locality (a settlement) in Tsarevskoye Rural Settlement, Leninsky District, Volgograd Oblast, Russia. The population was 89 as of 2010. There are 3 streets.

Geography 
Saray is located on the left bank of the Akhtuba River, 19 km ESE of Leninsk (the district's administrative centre) by road. Solodovka is the nearest rural locality.

References 

Rural localities in Leninsky District, Volgograd Oblast